Alvania subcalathus is a species of minute sea snail, a marine gastropod mollusk or micromollusk in the family Rissoidae.

Description
The length of the shell varies between 2.5 mm and 4.3 mm.

Distribution
This species occurs in the Atlantic Ocean off the Canary Islands.

References

 Gofas, S.; Le Renard, J.; Bouchet, P. (2001). Mollusca, in: Costello, M.J. et al. (Ed.) (2001). European register of marine species: a check-list of the marine species in Europe and a bibliography of guides to their identification. Collection Patrimoines Naturels, 50: pp. 180–213 (l

External links

 

Rissoidae
Gastropods described in 1906